Portugal competed at the 2015 World Championships in Athletics in Beijing, China, from 22–30 August 2015.

Medalists 
The following competitors from Portugal won medals at the Championships

Results
(q – qualified, NM – no mark, SB – season best)

Men
Track and road events

Field events

Women 
Track and road events

Field events

Sources 
Portuguese team

Nations at the 2015 World Championships in Athletics
World Championships in Athletics
2015